Davis Matthew Webb (born January 22, 1995) is an American football coach and former quarterback who is the quarterbacks coach for the Denver Broncos of the National Football League (NFL). He played college football at Texas Tech from 2013 to 2015 and California in 2016 and was drafted by the New York Giants in the third round of the 2017 NFL Draft. He also played for the New York Jets and Buffalo Bills before retiring in 2022. 

Webb began his coaching career in 2023 with the Denver Broncos as their quarterbacks coach after showing interest in coaching while with the Buffalo Bills.

High school 
Webb played at the high school level for Keller High School before moving to  Prosper High School in his hometown of Prosper, Texas under coach Kent Scott. While at Prosper High School, Webb guided the team to a district championship and a trip to the Texas 4A regional semifinals.

Webb earned several accolades and was named first-team All-District as a junior and honorable mention All-State. Webb graduated from Prosper after passing for 2,658 yards, 589 yards rushing, and 36 touchdowns.

College career

Texas Tech

2013
Webb was ranked a 4-star prospect coming out of high school by ESPN and signed with the Texas Tech Red Raiders. During his freshman year in 2013, Webb alternated as a backup quarterback behind fellow freshman Baker Mayfield and as a starter, becoming only the second true freshman at the position to ever play for the school. Webb had been afflicted by an undetermined illness.

Webb made his first game appearance in the contest against TCU, where he threw the game-winning touchdown to wide receiver Bradley Marquez. Following an injury to Mayfield, Webb made his first career start in an appearance against Iowa State, which saw him pass for 415 yards and 3 touchdowns. His performance marked the fourth most yards passing for first time starter in school history.

He would follow up his Iowa State performance with a record-setting performance against West Virginia. Webb passed for 462 yards, 36–50 attempts, and two touchdowns, making Webb the first quarterback in school history to pass for over 400 yards twice in his freshman season. Additionally, the yardage broke the school freshman passing record previously held by Billy Joe Tolliver. The passing yardage also set a Big 12 Conference freshman passing record, beating the mark set by Baylor's Nick Florence in 2009.

The game versus Oklahoma State saw Webb complete 45 passes on 71 attempts for 425 yards. The number of completions and attempts ranked fourth overall, and second overall behind Texas Tech quarterback Graham Harrell.

Webb struggled in an outing against Kansas State, and did not play in the second half. However, his 78 yards thrown pushed him over the previous record for the school single season freshman passing yards previously held by Zebbie Lethridge in 1994. After Webb's poor performance against Kansas State, Baker Mayfield would return to the starting role for the next two games against Baylor and Texas.

Following the conclusion of the regular season and during preparations for the 2013 Holiday Bowl, it was announced that fellow quarterback Baker Mayfield would transfer from the school following a 'miscommunication' and the open competition for the starting position. The departure of Mayfield ensured that the only competition for the starting job for the Holiday Bowl would be Michael Brewer.

After the month of bowl practice, Webb was named the starter for the Holiday Bowl against a top 15 Arizona State team. Webb would provide one of the most impressive performances of the 2013–14 NCAA football bowl season. He finished the game with 403 yards, 28–41 passing and four touchdowns in the 37–23 upset, tying a Holiday Bowl touchdown record and earning MVP honors.

Webb would conclude his freshman season with several Big 12 Conference freshman records: single game total offense, single game offensive plays, most 400 yard passing performances, passing yards in a single game, passing attempts in a single game, passes completed in a single game. His performance also marked school freshman records for completions, attempts, touchdowns, passing yards, and 400 yard games. Webb would later be named honorable mention Freshman All-American by College Football News, Big 12 Broadcasters Conference Freshman of the Year, as well as several weekly honors.

2014
Entering into the 2014 season, Webb was named the starting quarterback following the transfer of fellow quarterback Michael Brewer to Virginia Tech. Both Webb and the team as a whole were named dark horse candidates for the Heisman Trophy and the national championship respectively by ESPN. Webb was also named to the Maxwell Award and Manning Award watchlists for the best quarterback in college football. Webb started the first eight games of the season before suffering a season-ending ankle injury in a game against TCU on October 25, 2014. He was replaced by true freshman Patrick Mahomes. It was later revealed that Webb would undergo surgery on his shoulder, which he originally injured on September 25 in a game against Oklahoma State.

2015
In 2015, Webb was the backup quarterback to Patrick Mahomes, who retained possession of the starting quarterback job. On December 30, 2015, Webb announced his intentions to transfer from Texas Tech.

California 
On January 27, 2016, Webb announced his intention to transfer to the University of Colorado Boulder. At the time of the announcement, Webb was still enrolled at Texas Tech and was nine credit hours short of finishing his degree requirements. After finishing his degree requirements and graduating from Texas Tech, Webb planned to be in Colorado for the first summer session. In late May, Webb revealed that he would be transferring to the University of California, Berkeley, instead of Colorado. On May 25, 2016, California Golden Bears head coach Sonny Dykes announced that Webb had signed a financial aid agreement and was officially enrolled. As a graduate transfer, he was eligible to play immediately.

In his one season at California, Webb completed 382 of 620 passes (62%) for 4295 yards, 37 touchdowns and 12 interceptions for a 135.63 QBR. He set school single-season records for passing attempts, completions and total plays while tying three other school records, including total touchdowns [43 (37 passing, 6 rushing)], and 300-yard passing games (10). In 2016, he was named the Golden Bear's Season MVP and won the Reese's Senior Bowl MVP award. Webb was also nominated to the College Football All-America Team, and was a semi-finalist for both the Davey O'Brien National Quarterback Award and the Earl Campbell Tyler Rose Award, as well as an honorable mention All-Pac-12 choice of the league's coaches and the Pac-12 Newcomer of the Year. Webb was also in the final 15 for the Johnny Unitas Golden Arm Award.

College statistics

Professional career

New York Giants 
The New York Giants selected Webb in the third round (87th overall) of the 2017 NFL Draft. He was the fifth quarterback selected in 2017. On May 11, 2017, the New York Giants signed Webb to a four-year, $3.53 million contract that includes a signing bonus of $766,420.

On November 28, 2017, head coach Ben McAdoo announced that Geno Smith would replace Eli Manning as the starting quarterback and that Webb would also see playing time before the end of the season. McAdoo was later fired, along with Jerry Reese, the general manager who drafted Webb. Interim head coach Steve Spagnuolo admitted that it was likely Manning would remain the starter for the rest of season.

During the 2017 season, Webb drew praise from teammates Landon Collins and Dominique Rodgers-Cromartie. Rodgers-Cromartie remarked that Webb looked like a "Young Eli", while Collins said that the future front office should not draft a quarterback in the next draft, assuring them that "Davis is gonna be really good in the league when it’s his time". Three other teammates, Travis Rudolph, Kalif Raymond, and Marquis Bundy, also had positive comments about Webb, with Rudolph saying Webb has the highly sought-after 'it' factor. Eli  Manning nicknamed him Dragon.

During Week 16 of the 2017 season, it was revealed that Spagnuolo had Webb take snaps with the first-team in practice that week, for the first time that season. Despite this, Webb was inactive for the Week 16 game versus the Arizona Cardinals. He was promoted to second-string for the final game of the season.

On September 2, 2018, Webb was waived by the Giants after they claimed six players off waivers that day.

New York Jets 
On September 4, 2018, Webb was signed to the New York Jets' practice squad. He was promoted to the active roster on November 10, 2018, to serve as the backup to Josh McCown following an injury to rookie starter Sam Darnold. Webb was released as part of final roster cuts on August 31, 2019.

Buffalo Bills 
Webb was signed to the Buffalo Bills' practice squad on September 2, 2019. He signed a reserve/future contract with the Bills on January 6, 2020.

On September 5, 2020, Webb was waived by the Bills and signed to the practice squad the next day. He was elevated to the active roster on December 28 for the team's Week 16 game against the New England Patriots, and reverted to the practice squad after the game. On January 26, 2021, Webb signed a reserves/futures contract with the Bills.

On August 31, 2021, Webb was again waived by the Bills and resigned to the practice squad a day later. On November 14, 2021, he made his NFL debut against the New York Jets during garbage time. His contract expired when the team's season ended on January 23, 2022.

New York Giants (second stint) 
On February 7, 2022, the New York Giants signed Webb to a reserve/futures contract. He was waived on August 30, 2022, and signed to the practice squad the next day. On October 8, 2022, Webb was elevated from the practice squad for week 5 game against the Green Bay Packers. Webb was once again promoted to the active roster from the practice squad on January 7, 2023, ahead of Week 18 to start against the Philadelphia Eagles. This was Webb's first career NFL start, over 5 years after he was drafted.
In his first career start after six seasons in the NFL, he completed 23 of 40 attempts with 168 yards and threw his first career touchdown pass to Kenny Golladay, as well as a rushing TD as the Giants lost 16-22. His practice squad contract with the team expired after the season ended on January 21, 2023.

NFL career statistics

Coaching career

Denver Broncos
On February 23, 2023, Webb was hired by the Denver Broncos as their quarterbacks coach under head coach Sean Payton. Webb had expressed interest in transitioning to coaching duties, having been previously approached by the Buffalo Bills to be their quarterbacks coach.

References

External links
 California profile
 Texas Tech profile
 New York Giants profile

1995 births
Living people
American football quarterbacks
Buffalo Bills players
California Golden Bears football players
Denver Broncos coaches 
New York Giants players
New York Jets players
People from Prosper, Texas
Players of American football from Texas
Sportspeople from the Dallas–Fort Worth metroplex
Texas Tech Red Raiders football players